The Disputed Vote of Mr. Cayo is a 1986 Spanish film directed by Antonio Giménez-Rico. It is based on the 1978 homonymous novel written by Miguel Delibes.

Plot
The film begins during the years of democracy in Spain after the death of caudillo Francisco Franco. Rafael (Iñaki Miramón) is informed of the death of his former boss Victor Velasco (Juan Luis Galiardo), an honest and benevolent politician. In the funeral, Rafael sees Laly (Lydia Bosch), a former colleague in his political party, and they reminisce about the time they embarked on a campaign trip with Victor to the northern outskirts of Burgos to convince the local mayors of each zone for their vote. There they met Mr. Cayo, mayor of a small village and a self-sufficient farmer. Victor never found out for whom Mr. Cayo voted and this always intrigued him. After pressure from Laly, Rafael decides to go back to the small village to find the answer. As consequence, Rafael has flashbacks of his time campaigning with Victor in Burgos and the surrounding areas in June 1977. These were the first democratic elections of the post-Francoist era that were known as la Transición Española. Most of the film concerns his memories during the campaign trail. It is worth noting that the scenes during the democratic years are in black and white while the scenes during la Transición are in color.

The first scenes of Burgos during the first democratic elections focus on the saturation of political propaganda in the city's infrastructure. Since Victor is running for Senator, he embarks on a campaign trip, along with Rafael and Laly to the countryside to persuade local mayors for their vote. During the trip we see the generational differences between three and their perspectives on the country and society. Victor, the older and wiser politician, has a certain appreciation for the rural side of Burgos as he believes that it is of great importance for the post-Francoist Spain. To delve into the matter, landmarks are key components during the foundation of the modern nation state. When Victor sees the Ebro River during their trip, he appreciates it as a foundational component to the nation's identity. He compares it to what the Grand Canyon was for the United States during the expansion years. However, Rafael and Laly, the two generations following Victor's, fail to see its relevance as they show disinterest to the countryside.

They arrive at a village of three people where they meet Mayor Cayo Fernández (Francisco Rabal). At this point, the film valorizes the self-sufficient rural existence of Mr. Cayo in harmony with nature that is on the verge of extinction and attempts to bring the concerns of rural Spain to the political agenda of the transition. At the same time, it shows the disconnection between urban and rural society. As a result, Mr. Cayo is ironic and sardonic in his conversations with Victor, Rafael and Laly. For example, Victor introduces himself as the candidate for the poor. Mr. Cayo responds, "But I'm not poor" (Pero yo no soy pobre). In other words, Mr. Cayo has all the resources he needs to survive in his land, thus. Exchanges such as this one reflect the social differences between Mr. Cayo and the three political activists. Furthermore, Rafael's and Laly's lack of understanding of Mr. Cayos’ lifestyle magnify these social gaps. Victor, on the other hand, is able to connect and communicate with Mr. Cayo without any trouble and even admires him. Before they leave, members of the right wing party arrive to visit Mr. Cayo to persuade his vote. The young men beat up Victor after an exchange of votes and threaten Mr. Cayo for his vote. In addition, they vandalize the political propaganda put up by Rafael in the village with the phrase “Viva España”. They also put up their own posters. 
At the end of the film Rafael arrives at Mr. Cayo's house but the now older and fragile man is very sick and in need of help. Rafael does not know how to help, since Mr. Cayo only has herbal medicines, so instead he calls an ambulance. As Mr. Cayo is taken to the local hospital, Rafael stays in the house and sees in one of the walls a poster of Victor that he put up in the village during their trip.

References

External links
 

1986 films
Spanish drama films